Explode Together: The Dub Experiments 78-80 is a compilation of songs by English rock band XTC, released in 1990 by Virgin Records. It includes the Go+ EP (included with initial LP pressings of their second album, Go 2) as well as the Take Away / The Lure of Salvage LP (released by XTC frontman Andy Partridge as "Mr. Partridge"). Recorded during sessions on various breaks for the albums Drums and Wires (1979) and Black Sea (1980), the album consists of remixes of tracks recorded for the band's first three albums, with additional overdubs—and sometimes new vocals and lyrics—recorded by Partridge.

Track listing
Track notes adapted from XTC: Song Stories (1998), by XTC and Neville Farmer.

Albums produced by John Leckie
XTC compilation albums
1990 compilation albums
Virgin Records compilation albums